Captain Stephen Halden Beattie VC (29 March 1908 – 20 April 1975) was a Welsh recipient of the Victoria Cross, the highest and most prestigious award for gallantry in the face of the enemy that can be awarded to British and Commonwealth forces.

Biography
Beattie was born at Leighton, Montgomeryshire to Rev. Prebendary Ernest Halden Beattie, MC and Ethel Knowles. He was educated at Abberley Hall School in Worcester. He joined the Royal Navy in 1925 as a Special Entry Cadet.

Beattie was 33 years old, and a lieutenant-commander in the Royal Navy during the Second World War when the following deed at the St Nazaire Raid took place in 1942 whilst in command of HMS Campbeltown for which he was awarded the VC:

After grounding the ship, Beattie was taken prisoner of war by the Germans, spending the first part of his captivity in Frontstalag 133 at Rennes in France before being transferred to Marlag and Milag Nord, the POW camp for Royal Navy and Merchant Navy prisoners, near Bremen. He was notified of the award of the Victoria Cross during a special parade at Marlag and Milag Nord. He remained in captivity until 10 April 1945 when, as part of a prisoner of war column evacuated from the prison camp by the Germans, he was liberated at Lübeck. He was later mentioned in despatches for his gallant bearing in captivity.

In 1947 Beattie received the French Légion d'honneur. He later achieved the rank of captain and served as Senior Naval Officer, Persian Gulf from April 1956 to April 1958. His last appointment circa 1957-60 was Commanding Officer HMS Birmingham and Flag Captain to Flag Officer, Flotillas, Home Fleet. Later in the mid-1960s he was naval adviser to the Ethiopian government.

He died at Mullion, Cornwall. He is buried at Ruan Minor Churchyard in Helston, Cornwall, United Kingdom.

His Victoria Cross is displayed at the Imperial War Museum, London, England.

References

British VCs of World War 2 (John Laffin, 1997)
Monuments to Courage (David Harvey, 1999)
The Register of the Victoria Cross (This England, 1997)

External links
Location of grave and VC medal (Cornwall)
Royal Navy (RN) Officers 1939-1945

1908 births
1975 deaths
Royal Navy officers
Royal Navy officers of World War II
British World War II recipients of the Victoria Cross
Recipients of the Legion of Honour
World War II prisoners of war held by Germany
People from Montgomeryshire
Royal Navy recipients of the Victoria Cross
Recipients of the Croix de Guerre 1939–1945 (France)
Welsh recipients of the Victoria Cross
Ethiopian military personnel
Recipients of orders, decorations, and medals of Ethiopia